George Burton Rigg (February 9, 1872, Harrison County, Iowa – July 10, 1961) was an American botanist and ecologist, specializing in sphagnum bogs. In 1956 he received the Eminent Ecologist Award from the Ecological Society of America.

Education and career
George B. Rigg grew up on a farm near Woodbine, Iowa and graduated with a bachelor's degree in 1896 from the University of Iowa. In 1907 he went to Washington state's Puget Sound area, where he became a high school teacher. In 1909 he graduated with a master's degree in botany and become an instructor at the University of Washington. There he spent his academic career and was chair of the department of botany from 1940 to 1942. He taught for thirteen summers at the University of Washington's Friday Harbor Laboratories and also did some summer teaching at the University of Iowa and the University of Chicago. At the University of Chicago, he received his Ph.D. in botany in 1914 and learned from Henry Chandler Cowles and the plant physiologist William Crocker (1876–1950). Rigg's ecological research dealt mostly with peat bogs and marine algae. In 1913 he went to the coast of southwestern Alaska to investigate the effects on kelp of the pumice and volcanic ash produced by the 1912 eruption of Mount Katmai.

Rigg and the geoscientist Howard Ross Gould investigated Glacier Peak's volcanic ash deposits in peat bogs in Washington state and nearby areas.

Rigg's doctoral students include Henry Paul Hansen.

Selected publications

Articles

Books
with Theodore Christian Frye:

References

American botanists
American ecologists
People from Harrison County, Iowa
University of Iowa alumni
University of Washington alumni
University of Chicago alumni
University of Washington faculty
1872 births
1961 deaths